You Never Know is an album by drummer Peter Erskine featuring pianist John Taylor and bassist Palle Danielsson recorded in 1992 and released on the ECM label

Reception 
The Allmusic review by Lee Bloom awarded the album 2½ stars stating "The material on this date falls comfortably within the realm of what the ECM label is famous for; meticulously recorded, lyrical chamber music". Down Beat magazine gave the album 4½ stars, and heaped praise on Erskine's subtle playing, calling it "more zen than macho" and stating that "rather than keeping strict time, Peter plays a more melodic function here, commenting on the music while Danielsson holds the center."

Track listing
All compositions by John Taylor except as indicated
 "New Old Age" – 9:30 
 "Clapperclowe" – 4:55 
 "On the Lake" (Peter Erskine) – 5:07 
 "Amber Waves" (Vince Mendoza) – 5:45 
 "She Never Has a Window" (Mendoza) – 7:20 
 "Evans Above" – 6:19 
 "Pure and Simple" – 6:38 
 "Heart Game" (Mendoza) – 5:16 
 "Ev'rything I Love" (Cole Porter) – 7:45 
Recorded at Rainbow Studio in Oslo, Norway in July, 1992

Personnel
Peter Erskine — drums
John Taylor — piano 
Palle Danielsson — bass

References

ECM Records albums
Peter Erskine albums
1993 albums
Albums produced by Manfred Eicher